A suicide bomber detonated a truck at a checkpoint outside the Somali Youth League hotel at 7:45pm on 26 February 2016 in Mogadishu, Somalia. It was followed by his accomplices clashing with the hotel security guards. The police said they ended the attack by killing the four insurgent gunmen. Five militants, including the suicide bomber, as well as 14 civilians were killed. Al-Shabaab claimed responsibility. Sixteen other people were injured.

Five people were killed in a suicide bombing at the same hotel in January 2015.

References

2010s in Mogadishu
2016 in Somalia 
2016 disasters in Somalia 
2016 murders in Somalia
2016 road incidents
2010s road incidents in Africa
21st-century mass murder in Somalia
February 2016 attack
Attacks on buildings and structures in 2016
February 2016 attack
Attacks on hotels in Africa
Mass murder in 2016
February 2016 attack
Road incidents in Somalia
Suicide bombings in 2016
February 2016 attack
Terrorist incidents in Somalia in 2016
Somali Civil War (2009–present)
Building bombings in Somalia
Hotel bombings